The Journal of Informetrics is a closed-access quarterly peer-reviewed academic journal covering research on scientometrics and informetrics. It was established in 2007 by Leo Egghe. The journal is published by Elsevier. 

The editor-in-chief was Ludo Waltman (CWTS, Leiden University), until early 2019 when the full editorial board stepped down and founded the rival open-access journal Quantitative Science Studies.

References

External links 
 

Information science journals
Computer science journals
Publications established in 2007
English-language journals
Elsevier academic journals
Quarterly journals